Brachygaster is a genus of insects belonging to the family Evaniidae. It was first described by William Elford Leach in 1815.

The genus has almost cosmopolitan distribution.

Species
Species include the following:

References

Evanioidea
Hymenoptera genera
Taxa named by William Elford Leach